HM Prison Barwon or informally Barwon Prison, an Australian high risk and maximum security prison for males, is located  from the township of Lara, near Geelong, Victoria, Australia. The facility is operated by Corrections Victoria, part of the Department of Justice & Community Safety of the Government of Victoria. The prison provides accommodation and services for remand and sentenced prisoners detained under Victorian and Commonwealth legislation.

Barwon Prison is located adjacent to the 559-bed medium security Marngoneet Correctional Centre, opened in 2006.

History 
Barwon was built to cater for demand due to the recent closures of HM Prison Geelong in 1991 and HM Prison Pentridge in 1997.

Construction of the prison commenced in 1986. The works were carried out by Thiess Contractors. It was completed in October 1989 and the first prisoners were received in January 1990. Barwon is the only Victorian maximum security prison located outside the Melbourne metropolitan area.

Accommodation units 
Barwon provides accommodation and services for maximum security mainstream prisoners including a 20-bed facility for high security prisoners and a 60-bed facility for maximum security protection prisoners. A campus of the Box Hill Institute of TAFE operates at the prison providing a corrections education program.

The prison is split into many separate units including:
Acaciaa high security management unit that is used to accommodate high risk prisoners. This unit can hold up to 24 prisoners in 4 separate areas, and is the oldest management unit within the prison.
Banksiaa management unit for prisoners requiring close supervision or protection. All cells in this unit are single cells. 
Hoyaa protection unit which houses prisoners who, due to the nature of their crimes, are considered as at risk being housed alongside mainstream prisoners. Initially built as a demountable structure, this unit has remained as a permanent structure and is separated from all the other units.
Cassiaa mainstream unit which is classed as the reception unit for mainstream prisoners. This unit features both single and double cells and can house up to 80 prisoners.
Diosmaa mainstream unit which is seen as a first stop after Cassia, and houses prisoners who don't have lengthy sentences.
Eucalypta mainstream unit used to house older, more settled long term prisoners.
Grevilleaopened in April 2003, housing segregation prisoners. This unit housed protection prisoners until mid 2015, when its prisoners were transferred to make way for the incoming prisoners involved in the Metropolitan Remand Centre Riots. In early 2016 it was classified as a restricted regime unit, a stepping stone for prisoners transitioning out of high security units into mainstream units. In late 2016 it was again reclassified as a youth justice centre, to house 16 and 17 year olds after the loss of half of the Melbourne Youth Justice Precinct at Parkville.
Illawarrawas initially a mainstream unit for prisoners classified as Medium Security. Since 2016 has been used as a remand unit, housing prisoners yet to be convicted or sentenced, and as such offering more incentives such as longer let out hours and facilities. This unit is also a demountable building that has remained permanent and has the ability to be separated from the mainstream units because it is internally fenced and gated.
Melaleucaa high security unit that is used to accommodate high risk prisoners. This unit was opened in 2007 and can accommodate 24 prisoners in single cells, separated into 4 different areas.
Oleariathe newest High Security unit at the prison, officially opened on 10 August 2016 and accepting prisoners from 22 August 2016. The 36 million dollar expansion is officially a prison within a prison, separated from the rest of Barwon and housing its own visits centre and medical wing. The maximum security unit can hold up to 40 prisoners in single cells, including 20 that have their own small exercise yards for prisoners who cannot mix with others.

Incidents

In April 2010, convicted Melbourne gangland murderer and drug dealer Carl Williams was bashed to death inside the Acacia Unit by fellow prisoner Matthew Johnson.

A 2012 art exhibition called The Barwon Interviews, comprising video footage of twelve inmates, was part of a Monash University PhD project that was focused on examining prisoners adjusting to life inside Barwon Prison, their family struggles, and guilty consciences.

In February 2012, visiting Barwon Prison to speak to Indigenous inmates as part of a mentoring program, former AFL player Wayne Carey was found to have traces of cocaine on his clothing following a routine drug scan. Carey was informed that he could enter the prison if he submitted to a strip search. He declined and left the correctional facility.

In November 2014 a prisoner strapped a homemade explosive device to his body. The device was made partly from ground up matchheads and triggered a lockdown in the facility. Victoria Police specialist teams including the Critical Incident Response Team and the Bomb Squad were brought in to deal with the prisoner, who was subsequently charged and received extra time on his sentence.

In October 2015, several prison officers were injured in an unprovoked attack in the Grevillea unit of the prison. Two prisoners assaulted the officers as they were being led back to their cells from exercise.

On 11 February 2019, two members of Barwon Prison's Pacific Islander 'G-fam' group stood over Tony Mokbel and stabbed him with an improvised knife. He also received a fractured skull and loss of teeth in the attack. It is likely that the attack was a result of the previous day's newspaper headline story, that Mokbel was being an 'enforcer' within the prison and one of the men also accused the drug kingpin of "talking to the screws, you f***ing dog!"

Notable prisoners 
 
 Pasquale Barbaroconvicted drug dealer
 Abdul Nacer Benbrikaconvicted terrorist
 Christopher 'Badness' Binseconvicted armed robber who has spent the majority of his life in custody
 Gregory Brazelconvicted serial killer, sentenced to triple life imprisonment
 Leslie Camillericonvicted serial killer, sentenced to life imprisonment
 Mario Condelloconvicted drug trafficker and underworld figure; subsequently released and murdered
 Ashley Coulstonconvicted triple murderer
 Bandali Debsconvicted serial killer
 Paul Denyerconvicted serial killer
 Peter Dupasconvicted multiple murderer and rapist
 Keith Faureconvicted murderer
 Domenic Gattoa Melbourne businessman, detailed under bail and acquitted of all charges
 Evangelos Goussisconvicted murderer
 Matthew Charles Johnsonself-titled 'general' of prison gang, Prisoners of War; murdered Carl Williams in Barwon
 Brian Keith Jonesconvicted of the abduction and sexual assault of six children (released; later jailed indefinitely for breaches of parole)
 Julian Knightconvicted of the 1987 Hoddle Street massacre
 Peter James Knightconvicted murderer and anti-abortion activist
 Francesco Mangioneconvicted murderer in Mr Whippy turf war
 Craig Minoguethe Russell Street bomber
 Tony MokbelMelbourne underworld figure
 George Pellconvicted child sex offender until his conviction was quashed on 7 April 2020
 Hugo Richconvicted of armed robbery and murder
 John Sharpeconvicted of the 2004 double spear gun murders of his wife and child
 Matthew Walesconvicted of the 2002 Society Murders in Glen Iris
 Carl Williamsconvicted murderer, drug dealer and manufacturer; murdered in custody at Barwon

See also

List of prisons in Victoria

References

External links 
Barwon Prison profile: Department of Justice.

1990 establishments in Australia
Maximum security prisons in Australia
Prisons in Geelong